†Oriostomatoidea is an extinct superfamily of fossil sea snails, marine gastropod mollusks in the clade Neritimorpha.

Taxonomy 
Families within the superfamily Oriostomatoidea are as follows:
 † Family Oriostomatidae
 † Family Tubinidae

References

 Koken, E. (1896). Die Gastropoden der Trias um Hallstadt. Jahrbuch der Kaiserlich-Königlichen Geologischen Reichsanstalt. 46(1): 37−126
 W. Wenz. 1938. Handbuch der Paläozoologie; Gastropoda. Handbuch der Paläozoologie

Prehistoric gastropods